Daniel J. Boddicker (born November 18, 1962) was an American politician in the state of Iowa.

Boddicker was born in Vinton, Iowa. He grew up on the family farm near Vinton, and following graduation from High School, performed music throughout the mid west in the rock band RATLER. He married Carla Noller in 1983 (divorced in 2009). Attended Kirkwood Community College and worked as an electrical engineer at HWH Corp. for 26 years. During that time, he also served in the Iowa House of Representatives from 1993 to 2005 (39th district from 1993 to 2003 and 79th district succeeding Michael J. O'Brien from 2003 to 2005). During his legislative career, Boddicker served as chairman of the House Human Resources Committee for 8 years, and also served on the Judiciary and Law Enforcement, Labor and Industrial Relations, Education, Natural Resources, Human Services Budget Sub Committee, and Administration and Regulation Budget Sub Committee. He retired from the legislature in 2005. In 2011 was married Maureen Sorensson of Laramie, WY and now owns and operates Laramie Fire Extinguisher Services, LLC. in Laramie, WY.

References

1962 births
Living people
People from Vinton, Iowa
Kirkwood Community College alumni
American electrical engineers
Republican Party members of the Iowa House of Representatives